Creflo Augustus Dollar, Jr., (born January 28, 1962) is an American pastor, televangelist, and the founder of the non-denominational Christian World Changers Church International based in College Park, Georgia, a suburb of Atlanta. Dollar also heads the Creflo Dollar Ministerial Association (formerly called International Covenant Ministries),  Creflo Dollar Ministries, and Arrow Records.

Career
Dollar began developing World Changers Ministries Christian Center in 1986. He held the church's first worship service in the cafeteria of Kathleen Mitchell Elementary School in College Park, with eight people in attendance. He later renamed the ministry World Changers Church International (WCCI), and the congregation moved from the cafeteria to a dedicated chapel. Four services were held each Sunday, and Creflo added a weekly radio broadcast and the television show Changing Your World.

On December 24, 1995, WCCI moved into its present location, the 8,500-seat facility known as the World Dome. The church has said that the nearly $20 million World Dome was built without any bank financing. , the congregation reported having around 30,000 members, and $70 million in revenue (gross cash collections) for 2006.

In October 2012, Creflo Dollar Ministries leased Loews Paradise Theater in The Bronx for a new church location in New York.

Dollar also speaks at conferences and writes about his gospel of wealth and his involvement in televangelism.

Personal life 
Dollar and his wife Taffi have five children and reside in Atlanta, Georgia.

In June 2012, Dollar was arrested for an alleged attack on his fifteen-year-old daughter, according to the Fayette County, Georgia, Sheriff's Office.
Dollar was accused of choking and punching the girl, a story corroborated by Dollar's older daughter,  and Fayette County police released details of a subsequent 911 call. The charges were dropped in January 2013 after he attended anger management classes.

Finances and prosperity gospel teachings
Dollar is known for controversial teachings regarding prosperity theology. He has long been criticized for living a lavish lifestyle. He owns two Rolls-Royces, a private jet, and high-end real estate such as a million-dollar home in Atlanta, a $2.5 million home in Demarest, New Jersey, and a home in Manhattan that he bought for $2.5 million in 2006 (equivalent to $ million in ) and sold for $3.75 million in 2012 (equivalent to $ million in ). Dollar has refused to disclose his salary. For declining to disclose any financial information to independent audit, Creflo Dollar Ministries received a grade of "F" (failing) for financial transparency by the organization Ministry Watch. 

Dollar was among six televangelists who were the subject of a 2007 investigation led by United States Senator Chuck Grassley of Iowa as ranking member of the Senate Finance Committee. Grassley asked for financial information to determine whether Dollar made any personal profit from financial donations and requested that Dollar's ministry make the information available by December 6, 2007. The investigation also asked for information from five other televangelists: Benny Hinn, Kenneth Copeland, Eddie L. Long, Joyce Meyer, and Paula White. Dollar contested the probe, arguing that the proper governmental entity to examine religious groups is the IRS, not the Committee on Finance. Dollar and three others were not cooperative, and the probe concluded in 2011 without any charges.

Tithe retraction views

Over the years Dollar has written books and made video recordings about the obligation for Christians to pay tithe in the churches. However, in July 2022 he publicly retracted his views on tithing confessing that he has misled people with these teachings, stating that it was not biblical to tithe but up to individuals to offer according to their heart and ability. Dollar received praise and criticism for these statements.

References

External links
 Creflo Dollar at Creflo Dollar Ministries
 World Changers Church International

1962 births
Living people
American Pentecostal pastors
American television evangelists
Oral Roberts University people
People from College Park, Georgia
University of West Georgia alumni
North Central University alumni
Pentecostals from Georgia (U.S. state)
Prosperity theologians
African-American Christians